A with hook above (majuscule: Ả, minuscule: ả) is a letter of the Latin alphabet formed by addition of the hook above diacritic to the letter A. It is used in Vietnamese language.

Usage 
The letter is used in Vietnamese language, where it represents the open front unrounded vowel with falling-rising mid-tone (hỏi) ([a˧˩˧]).

Encoding

References 

Latin letters with diacritics